Carex frankii, also known as Frank's sedge, is a widespread species of flowering plant in the family Cyperaceae, native to temperate eastern North America; Ontario, the central and eastern United States, and Coahuila, Mexico. Preferring to grow in wet, shady situations such as the edges of streams and ponds, and erosion resistant, it is recommended for rain gardens.

References

frankii
Flora of Ontario
Flora of Alabama
Flora of Arkansas
Flora of Delaware
Flora of Georgia (U.S. state)
Flora of Illinois
Flora of Indiana
Flora of Iowa
Flora of Kansas
Flora of Kentucky
Flora of Maryland
Flora of Michigan
Flora of Missouri
Flora of Nebraska
Flora of New Jersey
Flora of New Mexico
Flora of New York (state)
Flora of North Carolina
Flora of Ohio
Flora of Oklahoma
Flora of Pennsylvania
Flora of South Carolina
Flora of Tennessee
Flora of Virginia
Flora of Washington, D.C.
Flora of West Virginia
Flora of Coahuila
Plants described in 1837
Flora without expected TNC conservation status